ASOG or asog or variation may refer to:

Places
 Asog, Coqên County, Tibet Autonomous Region, People's Republic of China; a village
 Mount Asog, Camarines Sur, Bicol Region, Luzon, Philippines; a volcano

People
 asogs, cross-dressing spiritual leaders from pre-colonial Philippines, see Transgender history

Air Support Operations Group
Air Support Operations Groups (ASOGs) are a type of USAF combat support unit
 1st Air Support Operations Group (1 ASOG)
 3d Air Support Operations Group (3 ASOG)
 18th Air Support Operations Group (10 ASOG)
 368th Expeditionary Air Support Operations Group
 504th Expeditionary Air Support Operations Group

Other uses
 A Shortfall of Gravitas, SpaceX's newest autonomous spaceport drone ship
 Ateneo School of Government (ASoG), a graduate school in the Philippines
 Activity Specific Operating Guidelines (ASOG), see List of abbreviations in oil and gas exploration and production
 ASOG (general safety and regulatory law), the foundational law of the Berlin Police

 ASOG Astronomical Society Of Geelong

See also
 SOG (disambiguation)
 OG (disambiguation)